Animomyia smithii is a species of geometrid moth in the family Geometridae. It is found in North America.

The MONA or Hodges number for Animomyia smithii is 6788.

Subspecies
These three subspecies belong to the species Animomyia smithii:
 Animomyia smithii magna Rindge, 1974
 Animomyia smithii nigris Cass & Swett, 1923
 Animomyia smithii smithii

References

Further reading

 

Nacophorini
Articles created by Qbugbot
Moths described in 1910